The Kangal Shepherd Dog is a traditional Turkish breed of large livestock guardian dog. The breed name derives from that of the town and district of Kangal in Sivas Province, the easternmost province of the Central Anatolia Region in central Turkey. The coat colour varies from pale fawn to wolf grey, always with a black mask. 

It is a traditional flock guardian dog, kept with flocks of sheep to fend off wolves and other predators. Some have been exported to African countries such as Namibia, Kenya and Tanzania, where they successfully protect local flocks from cheetahs, thus contributing to the conservation of endangered cheetah populations.

History 

The Kangal is a traditional working breed of Central Anatolia. The name derives from that of the town and district of Kangal in Sivas Province, the easternmost province of the Central Anatolia Region. The Kangal has been used by shepherds for protection against wolves and other predators for centuries.    
A DNA study found that the dogs of Kazakhstan, Uzbekistan, Tajikistan and Afghanistan are genetically closest to Kangal dogs, and the researchers propose that the breed may have been brought from Central Asia by the nomadic Turks.

The Kangal was definitively accepted by the Fédération Cynologique Internationale in 1989; the most recent breed standard was published in 2018.

The Kennel Club of the United Kingdom recognised the Turkish Kangal Dog with effect from April 2013, and a provisional breed standard was published early in that year; owners of dogs registered as Anatolian Shepherd Dogs could apply for them to be re-registered under the new name.

Around 300 of the dogs have been given to farmers in Namibia since 1994 by the Cheetah Conservation Fund to help protect livestock from cheetah attacks, and the programme has been extended to Kenya. Since then, the number of cheetahs killed by farmers is calculated to have fallen from 19 per farmer annually to 2.4. Livestock losses have been cut significantly at more than 80% of the farms where the dogs have been adopted. The great majority of cheetahs that are still killed by farmers are killed after specific attacks on livestock. Previously, the cats were tracked and killed whenever they neared a farm.

Anatolian Shepherd 
Anatolian Shepherd Dog is the name used in the United States to describe dogs descended from regional Turkish livestock guardian dogs, particularly the Kangal but also the Akbash, from the late 1960s. In 1967 a US Navy Lieutenant who was stationed in Turkey, Robert Ballard, acquired two working livestock guardians Zorba and Peki, from breeders in the Ankara region, Zorba was a long-coated pinto-colored dog and Peki a short-coated buff-colored bitch. In the late 1960s Ballard returned to the United States and took his dogs with him and in 1970 the pair bred their first litter, becoming the foundation stock of the breed in the United States. A breed club was quickly formed and further examples were imported from Turkey. In developing the breed, the American enthusiasts acted without understanding of regional Turkish varieties of shepherd's dogs, with the result that the American dogs could be bred with various coat lengths, colors and color patterns whilst in Turkey the different breeds breed more true to a set coat type. This was further exacerbated by most of these dogs being sourced in the intermediate zone between the main breeding centers of the Akbash and the Kangal, where examples of both types can be found. Anatolian Shepherd is a mixed dog breed of all Turkish livestock guardian dogs. 
In subsequent years animosity developed between American breeders, who insisted their dogs were the true Turkish shepherd's dog, and Turkish breeders who believed, and stated, they were an amalgam of various Turkish breeds. Insults and counter-insults were exchanged with American breeders accusing the Turks of marketing dogs of dubious ancestry as independent breeds and the Turks stating the Americans were breeding crossbred dogs. The name Anatolian Shepherd Dog is unknown in Turkey and the breed is sometimes described as having the Turkish name of Çoban Köpeği which means 'shepherd's dog', or livestock guardian dog. Since the 1980s Americans have almost exclusively imported Kangals and the Anatolian has increasingly conformed to that breed type. Despite this, pups of mixed appearance are still whelped and Turkish authorities still refuse to recognise Anatolians as a purebred Turkish breed.

Characteristics 

The Kangal Shepherd Dog is not as heavy as some other mastiff breeds, allowing it greater speed and agility than larger dogs.
The under-layer provides insulation against both severe Anatolian winters and the fierce summer sun, while the outer-layer repels water and snow. This combination of coat allows it to regulate its core temperature more efficiently, while the coat is dense enough to repel rupture from wolf bites.

Use 

The Kangal is a traditional flock guardian dog, kept with flocks of sheep to fend off wolves and other predators. Some have been exported to African countries such as Namibia, Kenya and Tanzania, where they successfully protect local flocks from cheetahs, thus contributing to the conservation of endangered cheetah populations.

References 

Dog breeds originating in Turkey
FCI breeds
Livestock guardian dogs